Peter Madden (31 October 1934 – 13 April 2020) was an English professional footballer who played for Rotherham United from 1955–1966. He was also manager of the English football clubs Darlington (1975–1978) and Rochdale (1980–1983). After leaving Rochdale in March 1983 he stayed in the area and ran a public house in nearby Littleborough. He was married to Christine and a father to five. He died in April 2020 at the age of 85.

Managerial stats

References

External links

1934 births
2020 deaths
English footballers
English football managers
English Football League players
Association football defenders
Rotherham United F.C. players
Bradford (Park Avenue) A.F.C. players
Aldershot Town F.C. players
Darlington F.C. managers
Rochdale A.F.C. managers
Skegness Town A.F.C. players
Footballers from Bradford
Publicans